Eois lucivittata is a moth in the  family Geometridae. It is found in Peru and Colombia.

Subspecies
Eois lucivittata lucivittata (south-eastern Peru)
Eois lucivittata expurgata Prout, 1922 (Colombia)

References

Moths described in 1907
Taxa named by William Warren (entomologist)
Eois
Moths of South America